Arthur Clinton "Woody" Woodward (June 9, 1883 – February 2, 1950) was a minor league baseball player and an American football and basketball coach. He spent three seasons playing minor league baseball for teams in New England before embarking on a coaching career. Woodward served as the head football coach at State Normal School at Cheney—now known as Eastern Washington University—from 1927 to 1928, compiling a record of 7–8. He was also the school's head basketball coach from 1927 to 1930, tallying a mark of 26–29.

Head coaching record

Football

References

External links
 
 

1883 births
1950 deaths
Baseball first basemen
Eastern Washington Eagles football coaches
Eastern Washington Eagles men's basketball coaches
Fall River Indians players
Lowell Tigers players
High school football coaches in Washington (state)
People from Taunton, Massachusetts
Baseball players from Massachusetts
Basketball coaches from Massachusetts